Scamander is a small town at the mouth of the Scamander River between St Helens and St Marys on the north-east coast of Tasmania in Australia. The town is a popular holiday destination because of its wide, sandy beaches and views of the ocean. Recreational activities include surfing, swimming and fishing for bream in the river.

History

The first European to travel through the area was surveyor John Helder Wedge in 1825. He named the river "Borthwick" and the position itself he named "Yarmouth" after the English port  Great Yarmouth but both the river and town were both later renamed "Scamander".

The wide river mouth has been a challenge to bridge builders for many years. Richard Terry constructed a timber bridge in 1865, but it collapsed around May in 1875 while a large herd of cattle was being driven across it. A second and third bridge were successively washed away in floods in 1889 and 1911. Further bridges succumbed to flood and shipworms, the last timber bridge collapsing in 1929. A truss bridge was built in 1936 and still stands today, used by pedestrians and bicycles. The concrete bridge that currently carries the Tasman Highway was built on a better alignment nearby and officially opened on 26 June 1991.

Scamander Post Office opened on 1 October 1896 and closed in 1933. It reopened in 1950.

On the evening of 11 December 2006, 18 houses and a restaurant were razed by a bushfire that swept around the small town.

Climate
Scamander has a mild oceanic climate (Cfb) with tepid summers and cool winters, and moderate rainfall spread through the months.

Services
Services in Scamander include:
Resort Hotel
Bottle Shop
Two Caravan Parks
Numerous Bed and Breakfasts
Several small motels
Supermarket/minimarket
Petrol Station including mechanic
Fast food store
Surf Shop
Post office
Coffee, Book & Video store
JCG Marine charter
Local Handymen

References

External links

Walkabout – Scamander

Towns in Tasmania
Localities of Break O'Day Council